Igor Vladimirovich Sposobin (1900-1954) was a musicologist  and musical educator. He graduated from the Moscow Conservatory. Trainee GE Conus and RM Glier.

Since 1924 teacher of music theory at the Moscow Conservatory (since 1939 Professor in 1943-48 - Head of the Department of Music Theory). Among the many disciples, IA Autograph, VO Burke, DA Blum, TF Mueller, SS Grigoryev YN Holopov, VP Fraenov, EM Fraenova et al.

Author of textbooks on harmony, analysis forms, elementary music theory, ear training manuals on.

The school taught music theory subjects in the 1930s-1940s. During the Great Patriotic War, he headed the theoretical department.

References

1900 births
1954 deaths
Soviet music educators
Soviet musicologists
20th-century musicologists